Irina Kornienko (born 16 January 1978) is a Russian former professional tennis player.

Kornienko, a right-handed player, reached her career-high singles ranking of 452 in 1998.

All of her WTA Tour main-draw appearances came in doubles, which included making the quarterfinals of the 1999 Tashkent Open. She won six ITF doubles titles and had a best doubles ranking of 263 in the world.

In 2005, she married tennis player Igor Kunitsyn.

ITF finals

Doubles: 12 (6–6)

References

External links
 
 

1978 births
Living people
Russian female tennis players
20th-century Russian women
21st-century Russian women